The Union order of battle during the Battle of Gettysburg includes the American Civil War officers and men of the Army of the Potomac (multiple commander names indicate succession of command during the three-day battle (July 1–3, 1863)).
Order of battle compiled from the army organization during the battle, the casualty returns and the reports.

Abbreviations used

Military rank
 MG = Major General
 BG = Brigadier General
 Col = Colonel
 Ltc = Lieutenant Colonel
 Maj = Major
 Cpt = Captain
 Lt = Lieutenant
 Sgt = Sergeant

Other
 w = wounded
 mw = mortally wounded
 k = killed
 c = captured
 m = missing

Army of the Potomac

MG George G. Meade, Commanding

General Staff and Headquarters

General Staff:
 Chief of Staff: MG Daniel Butterfield (w)
 Assistant Adjutant General: BG Seth Williams
 Assistant Inspector General: Col Edmund Schriver
 Chief Quartermaster: BG Rufus Ingalls
 Commissaries and subsistence: Col Henry F. Clarke
 Chief of Artillery: BG Henry J. Hunt (w)
 Chief Ordnance Officer: Cpt Daniel W. Flagler
 Chief Signal Officer: Cpt Lemuel B. Norton
 Medical Director: Maj Jonathan Letterman
 Chief of Engineers: BG Gouverneur K. Warren (w)
 Bureau of Military Information: Col George H. Sharpe

General Headquarters:

Command of the Provost Marshal General: BG Marsena R. Patrick
 93rd New York: Col John S. Crocker
 8th United States (8 companies): Cpt Edwin W. H. Read
 2nd Pennsylvania Cavalry: Col Richard Butler Price
 6th Pennsylvania Cavalry (Companies E & I): Cpt James Starr
 Regular cavalry

Guards and Orderlies:
 Oneida (New York) Cavalry: Cpt Daniel P. Mann

Engineer Brigade: BG Henry W. Benham
 15th New York (3 companies): Maj Walter L. Cassin
 50th New York: Col William H. Pettes
 U.S. Battalion: Cpt George H. Mendell

I Corps

MG John F. Reynolds (k)  

MG Abner Doubleday

MG John Newton

General Headquarters:
 1st Maine Cavalry, Company L: Cpt Constantine Taylor

II Corps

MG Winfield S. Hancock (w)

BG John Gibbon

BG William Hays

General Headquarters:
 6th New York Cavalry, Companies D and K: Cpt Riley Johnson (Escort)
 53rd Pennsylvania Infantry , Companies A, B and K: Maj Octavus Bull (Provost Marshal 2nd Corps)

III Corps

MG Daniel E. Sickles (w)

MG David B. Birney (w)

V Corps

MG George Sykes

General Headquarters:
 12th New York Infantry (Companies D and E): Cpt Henry W. Ryder
 17th Pennsylvania Cavalry, Companies D and H: Cpt William Thompson

VI Corps

MG John Sedgwick

General Headquarters:
 1st New Jersey Cavalry, Company L and 1st Pennsylvania Cavalry, Company H: Cpt William S. Craft

XI Corps

MG Oliver O. Howard

MG Carl Schurz

General Headquarters:
 1st Indiana Cavalry, Companies I and K: Cpt Abram Sharra
 8th New York Infantry (1 company): Lt Hermann Foerster

XII Corps

MG Henry W. Slocum

BG Alpheus S. Williams

Provost Guard:
 10th Maine Battalion (3 companies): Cpt John D. Beardsley

Cavalry Corps

MG Alfred Pleasonton

Headquarter Guards:
 1st Ohio Cavalry, Company A: Cpt Noah Jones (Second Division)
 1st Ohio Cavalry, Company C: Cpt Samuel N. Stanford (Third Division)

Artillery Reserve
BG Robert O. Tyler

Cpt James M. Robertson

Headquarter Guard:
 32nd Massachusetts Infantry, Company C: Cpt Josiah C. Fuller

Notes

References
 U.S. War Department, The War of the Rebellion: a Compilation of the Official Records of the Union and Confederate Armies. Washington, DC: U.S. Government Printing Office, 1880–1901.
 Gettysburg National Military Park - The Army of the Potomac at Gettysburg
 Civil War Trust - Gettysburg Union order of battle
 Civilwarhome - Gettysburg Union order of battle
 Gettysburg Discussion Group - Union order of battle
 Eicher, John H. "Gettysburg Order of Battle" at Gettysburg Discussion Group website.

External links

American Civil War orders of battle